Quercus pyrenaica, commonly known as Pyrenean oak, is a tree native to southwestern Europe and northwestern North Africa. Despite its common name, it is rarely found in the Pyrenees Mountains and is more abundant in northern Portugal and north and northwestern Spain.

It is placed in section Quercus.

The oak is cultivated as an ornamental tree for gardens and parks.

Description
It has an average lifespan of 300 years. The leaves have short petioles and are deeply and irregularly lobed, with four to eight pairs of lobes per leaf. There are stellate hairs on both sides of the leaf. Roots frequently produce suckers. The species has high resprouting capabilities.

Distribution and habitat
In the Iberian Peninsula, which represents 95% of its population, it occupies mainly the northern portion, south of the Cantabrian Mountains, very common in the west of the Peninsula in the northern half of mountainous Portugal, and rare on the east It is adapted both to sub-humid temperate and Mediterranean semi-arid conditions, from the humid Peneda-Gerês National Park in Portugal, to the semi-arid Spanish central plain. It is also adapted to survive in hot local temperatures. It is thought to have a short growth season to avoid the summer drought. It is often the dominant species in the forests in which it occurs. Its acorns are dispersed by birds and small mammals.

Threats

The species is currently threatened by wild fire which encourage the growth of other oak species that Q. pyrenaica is unable to compete with, and insect pathogens such as green oak leaf roller moth (Tortrix viridana), the gipsy moth (Lymantria dispar) and brown-tail moth (Euproctis chrysorrhoea); these threats may become of greater concern due to the impact of climate change.

Historically the species experienced decline due to charcoal and timber industry, and forestry activities still pose some threat to Q. pyrenaica but on a much reduced scale.

References

External links

 

pyrenaica
Flora of North Africa
Trees of Europe
Flora of Portugal
Flora of Spain
Flora of France
Flora of Morocco
Trees of Mediterranean climate
Garden plants of Europe
Drought-tolerant trees
Ornamental trees
Plants described in 1805